The electoral district of Morwell is an electoral district of the Victorian Legislative Assembly. It covers the regional centres of Moe, Morwell and Traralgon, as well as the surrounding rural areas in the middle of Gippsland.

Created in 1955, it was held by the Liberals until the 1970 election, when it was won by Labor. They held the seat until the 2006 election, when the Nationals gained the seat. In 2017, Nationals MP Russell Northe resigned from the party, becoming an independent. At the 2022 election, the Nationals regained the seat with Martin Cameron being elected.

Members for Morwell

Election results

External links
 Electorate profile: Morwell District, Victorian Electoral Commission

References

Electoral districts of Victoria (Australia)
1955 establishments in Australia
Gippsland (region)
City of Latrobe